Voxtrot is an American indie pop band formed in Austin, Texas in 2003. Their first recordings were released in 2003, and their debut EP, Raised by Wolves, was released in 2005 to critical acclaim, garnering attention from music bloggers as well as major publications such as Pitchfork and Spin.

The band released two additional EPs in 2006, Mothers, Sisters, Daughters & Wives, and Your Biggest Fan, before releasing their debut self-titled album in 2007. After releasing their first album, the group continued to perform live and released several singles before announcing their impending disbandment in April 2010. The band performed a short tour of the United States leading up to their dissolution, ending in New York City on June 26, 2010.

On May 6, 2022, the group announced they were embarking on a reunion tour through the latter part of the year.

History

Early work; Voxtrot
Voxtrot was formed in Austin, Texas by singer-songwriter and Texas native Ramesh Srivastava in the early 2000s. Srivastava had previously studied at the University of Glasgow before dropping out of the Berklee College of Music and returning to Texas. Early incarnations of the group included Jennifer Moore and Brandon Eastes, but by 2005 when the band's self-released debut, a five-song EP entitled Raised by Wolves, was released the lineup had been solidified to include Srivastava, Jason Chronis, Matt Simon, Mitch Calvert, and Jared van Fleet.

After the release of Raised by Wolves in July 2005, the band began touring nationally and received accolades from various online and print publications such as Spin and Pitchfork. Spin noted that Raised by Wolves was "...a stunning mini-collection of John Hughes-heyday paeans, twitchy pop, and surging, Strokes-y dancefloor fillers." A second five-song EP, Mothers, Sisters, Daughters & Wives, arrived in stores on April 4, 2006. The three-song EP Your Biggest Fan followed on November 17 of the same year.

On October 26, 2006, the Los Angeles Times reported that the group was entering the studio to record their debut album. Initially, the group had sought Stephen Street, who had previously worked with The Smiths and Blur, to produce the album, but Street was unable to due to scheduling conflicts. The band's first full-length self-titled debut album was released on May 22, 2007, by Beggars Group. The album peaked at number 42 on the Billboard Independent Albums chart. Eric Harvey of Pitchfork awarded the album a 5.9 out of 10 rating, writing: "Voxtrot shows a young band eagerly trying to have it all: attempting to establish a mature musical identity while aiming for a wide audience. Voxtrot may very well have a great pop record within them, yet their first effort stumbles from the band's enthusiastic, ambitious attempt to produce it immediately." The album's first single, "Blood Red Blood", was released as a 7" limited to 1,000 copies June 4, 2007 by Playlouder Recordings. In June 2007, the band performed a Take-Away Show acoustic session shot by Vincent Moon. To promote the album, the band toured with Au Revoir Simone and Favourite Sons in the summer of 2007.

Later singles and dissolution
In March 2009, Voxtrot released the single "Trepanation Party", which received significant airplay on the Sirius/XM's influential Sirius XMU channel. The track was recorded and mixed with Jim
Eno of the band Spoon. The sound of "Trepanation Party" is a significant departure from their indie sound, towards a more synth-pop feel.

Voxtrot released a limited edition 7" single "Berlin, Without Return..." on August 3, 2009. The single contained the song "The Dream Lives of Ordinary People" as a B-side and was initially released in a limited pressing of 400 copies. The single was self-released by the band's own Cult Hero Records.

On April 21, 2010, lead singer Srivastava announced on the band's website that they would be breaking up following a short tour, entitled the 'Goodbye, Cruel World..." tour, which consisted of a total of seven dates. In the letter addressed to fans, Srivastava noted that "The career path of Voxtrot was truly one of long, simmering build, explosion, and almost instantaneous decay. Slowly, I am learning to replace any feelings of regret with positive memories of how amazing the whole thing was, and how it has, in an unexpected way, fortified my character." The band performed their last show on June 26, 2010incidentally Srivastava's 27th birthday at the Bowery Ballroom in New York City.

Former lead singer Srivastava released his first solo album, The King, in 2014 after releasing several tracks and an EP.

2022 reunion
On May 6, 2022, the group announced they were embarking on a reunion tour through the latter part of the year, along with the release of archival recordings.

Discography

Albums 
 Voxtrot (2007) Playlouderecordings / The Beggars Group

 Early Music (2022), a remastered release of the band's first two EPs 

 Cut from the Stone: Rarities & B-Sides (2022)

EPs 
 Raised by Wolves (EP) (2005) Cult Hero Records
 Mothers, Sisters, Daughters & Wives EP (2006) Cult Hero Records
 Your Biggest Fan EP & 7" (2006) Beggars Group/Playlouderecordings

US singles
 The Start of Something 7" b/w "Dirty Version" (2004) Cult Hero Records / The Bus Stop Label
 Raised by Wolves 7" b/w "They Never Mean What They Say" (2005) Magic Marker Records
 Trepanation Party digital single (2009) Cult Hero Records
 Berlin, Without Return... 7" b/w "The Dream Lives Of Ordinary People" (2009) Cult Hero Records

UK/Europe singles 
 Mothers, Sisters, Daughters & Wives 7" b/w "Rise Up in the Dirt" (2006) Full Time Hobby Records
 Mothers, Sisters, Daughters & Wives EP & 2x7" (2006) Re-Issue / Beggars Group/Playlouderecordings
 Trouble 7" (limited to 1000 copies) and digital single, from the Your Biggest Fan EP (2007) Beggars Group/Playlouderecordings
 Blood Red Blood 7" (limited to 1000 copies) and digital single, from Voxtrot (2007) Beggars Group/Playlouderecordings
 Firecracker 7" (limited to 1000 copies), CD and digital single, from Voxtrot (2007) No. 19 UK Indie Beggars Group/Playlouderecordings

Compilations 
 "The Start of Something" featured on Bang Crash Boom, Little Teddy Recordings, 2005 (Germany)
 "Warmest Part of the Winter" featured on Little Darla Has a Treat for You, vol. 24 · Darla Records, 2006 (US)
 "The Start Of Something" featured on The Kids at the Club, How Does It Feel To Be Loved, 2006 (UK)
 "The Start of Something" featured on the feature film The Ex 2007 (US)
 "Whiskey & Water" featured on P.E.A.C.E., Buffet Libre/Amnesty International, 2010 (Spain)

Videos 
 Firecracker on YouTube.com
 Steven on YouTube.com

Chart positions

Members
Ramesh Srivastavavocals, rhythm guitar 
Mitch Calvertlead guitar 
Jason Chronisbass 
Jared van Fleetkeyboards, guitar, strings 
Matt Simondrums

References

External links 

 Official site
 Official Facebook page
 The Voxtrot Kid, Srivastava's personal blog dating from 2005
 Voxtrot (2010) LP promotional site
 Podcast interview with Soundcrank, June 11, 2006 
 Live footage, Minneapolis, February 27, 2006

Musical groups established in 2003
Musical groups disestablished in 2010
Indie rock musical groups from Texas
Musical groups from Austin, Texas
2003 establishments in Texas
Darla Records artists